The American Football Conference (AFC) is one of the two conferences of the National Football League (NFL), the highest professional level of American football in the United States. The AFC and its counterpart, the National Football Conference (NFC), each contain 16 teams with 4 divisions. Both conferences were created as part of the 1970 merger between the National Football League, and the American Football League (AFL). All ten of the AFL teams, and three NFL teams, became members of the new AFC, with the remaining thirteen NFL teams forming the NFC. A series of league expansions and division realignments have occurred since the merger, thus making the current total of 16 teams in each conference. The current AFC champions are the Kansas City Chiefs, who defeated the Cincinnati Bengals in the 2022 season's AFC Championship Game for their third conference championship.

Teams
Like the NFC, the conference has 16 teams organized into four divisions each with four teams: East, North, South and West.

Season structure

This chart of the 2021 season standings displays an application of the NFL scheduling formula. The Bengals in 2021 (highlighted in green) finished in first place in the AFC North. Thus, in 2021, the Bengals are scheduled to play two games against each of its division rivals (highlighted in light blue), one game against each team in the AFC East and NFC South (highlighted in yellow), and one game each against the first-place finishers in the AFC South, AFC West (highlighted in orange), and NFC East (highlighted in pink).
Currently, the fourteen opponents each team faces over the 17-game regular season schedule are set using a pre-determined formula:

Each AFC team plays the other teams in their respective division twice (home and away) during the regular season, in addition to eleven other games assigned to their schedule by the NFL: three games are assigned on the basis of a particular team's final divisional standing from the previous season, and the remaining eight games are split between the roster of two other NFL divisions. This assignment shifts each year and will follow a standard cycle. Using the 2021 regular season schedule as an example, each team in the AFC West plays against every team in the AFC North and NFC East. In this way, non-divisional competition will be mostly among common opponents – the exception being the three games assigned based on the team's prior-season divisional standing.

At the end of each season, the four division winners and three wild cards (non-division winners with best regular season record) in the AFC qualify for the playoffs. The AFC playoffs culminate in the AFC Championship Game, with the winner receiving the Lamar Hunt Trophy. The AFC champion then plays the NFC champion in the Super Bowl.

History

Both the AFC and the NFC were created after the NFL merged with the American Football League (AFL) in 1970. The AFL began play in 1960 with eight teams, and added two more expansion clubs (the Miami Dolphins in 1966 and the Cincinnati Bengals in 1968) before the merger. In order to equalize the number of teams in each conference, three NFL teams that predated the AFL's launch (the Cleveland Browns, Pittsburgh Steelers, and the then-Baltimore Colts) joined the ten former AFL teams to form the AFC. The two AFL divisions AFL East and AFL West were more or less intact, while the NFL's Century Division, in which the Browns and the Steelers had played since 1967, was moved from the NFL to become the new AFC Central. Upon the completion of the merger of the AFL and NFL in 1970, the newly minted American Football Conference had already agreed upon their divisional setup along mostly geographical lines for the 1970 season; the National Football Conference, however, could not agree upon their setup, and one was chosen from a fishbowl on January 16, 1970.

Since the merger, five expansion teams have joined the AFC and two have left, thus making the current total 16. When the Seattle Seahawks and the Tampa Bay Buccaneers joined the league in 1976, they were temporarily placed in the NFC and AFC respectively. This arrangement lasted for one season only before the two teams switched conferences. The Seahawks eventually returned to the NFC as a result of the 2002 realignment. The expansion Jacksonville Jaguars joined the AFC in 1995. There have been five teams that have relocated at least once. In 1984, the Baltimore Colts relocated to Indianapolis. In 1995, the Cleveland Browns had attempted to move to Baltimore; the resulting dispute between Cleveland and the team led to Modell establishing the Baltimore Ravens with the players and personnel from the Browns, while the Browns were placed in suspended operations before they were reinstated by the NFL. The Ravens were treated as an expansion team.

In California, the Oakland Raiders relocated to Los Angeles in 1982, back to Oakland in 1995, and then to Las Vegas in 2020, while the San Diego Chargers returned to Los Angeles in 2017 after 56 years in San Diego.

The Houston Oilers moved to Tennessee in 1997, where they were renamed the Tennessee Oilers. The team would change its name again, two years later, to the Tennessee Titans.

The NFL would again expand in 2002, adding the Houston Texans to the AFC. With the exception of the aforementioned relocations since that time, the divisional setup has remained static ever since.

Between 1995 and 2021, the AFC has sent only 9 of its 16 teams to the Super Bowl: New England Patriots (10 times), Pittsburgh Steelers (4 times), Denver Broncos (4 times), Baltimore Ravens (2 times), Indianapolis Colts (2 times), Kansas City Chiefs (2 times), Cincinnati Bengals (1 time), Las Vegas Raiders (1 time), Tennessee Titans (1 time). By contrast, the NFC has sent 13 of the 16 NFC teams during that same time frame with only the Detroit Lions, Minnesota Vikings, and Washington Commanders missing out on an appearance in the Super Bowl. 17 of the 19 AFC champions from 2001 to 2019 have started one of just three quarterbacks - Tom Brady, Peyton Manning and Ben Roethlisberger - in the Super Bowl. The AFC has started 7 quarterbacks in the last 20 Super Bowls, while the NFC has started 16.

Logo

The merged league created a new logo for the AFC that took elements of the old AFL logo, specifically the "A" and the six stars surrounding it. The AFC logo basically remained unchanged from 1970 to 2009. The 2010 NFL season introduced an updated AFC logo, with the most notable revision being the removal of two stars (leaving four representing the four divisions of the AFC), and moving the stars inside the letter, similar to the NFC logo.

Television
NBC aired the AFC's Sunday afternoon and playoff games from 1970 through the 1997 season. From 1998 to 2013, CBS was the primary broadcast rightsholder to the AFC; in those years, all interconference games in which the AFC team was the visiting team were broadcast on either NBC or CBS. Since 2014, the cross-flex policy allows select AFC games (that involve them playing an NFC team at home or intraconference games) to be moved from CBS to Fox. Since 1990, select AFC playoff games have been seen on ABC or ESPN.

See also
AFC Championship Game
AFC Divisions
AFC East
AFC North
AFC South
AFC West
AFC Division Rivals

AFC East
Bills-Dolphins rivalry
Bills-Patriots rivalry
Bills-Jets rivalry
Dolphins-Patriots rivalry
Dolphins-Jets rivalry
Jets-Patriots rivalry
AFC North
Bengals-Ravens rivalry
Bengals-Browns rivalry
Bengals-Steelers rivalry
Browns-Ravens rivalry
Browns-Steelers rivalry
Ravens-Steelers rivalry
AFC South Rivals
Colts-Texans rivalry
Texans-Titans rivalry
Jaguars-Titans rivalry
AFC West Rivals
Broncos-Raiders rivalry
Broncos-Chiefs rivalry
Broncos-Chargers rivalry
Chargers-Raiders rivalry
Chargers-Chiefs rivalry
Chiefs-Raiders rivalry
AFC Interdivisional Rivals
Bills-Titans rivalry
Broncos-Patriots rivalry
Broncos-Steelers rivalry
Colts-Patriots rivalry
Dolphins-Raiders rivalry
Raiders-Steelers rivalry
Patriots-Ravens rivalry
Patriots-Steelers rivalry
Steelers-Titans rivalry
Ravens-Titans rivalry

AFC Television Network
NFL on NBC
NFL on CBS 1998 Present

References

National Football League
Conference
Sports organizations established in 1970